Justin Wolf (born 15 October 1992) is a German professional road and track cyclist, who most recently rode for UCI Continental team .

Major results
2010
 1st  Team pursuit, Junior National Track Championships
2017
 3rd Individual pursuit, National Track Championships
2019
 2nd  Team relay, UEC European Road Championships
 2nd Chrono Champenois
 5th Time trial, National Road Championships
 8th Overall Tour of Mesopotamia
 9th Chrono des Nations
2020
 UEC European Road Championships
1st  Team relay
7th Time trial
 1st Prologue Tour of Romania
2021
 1st Stage 1 Tour of Mevlana
 1st Stage 6 Tour de Bretagne
 2nd  Team relay, UEC European Road Championships
 2nd Overall Belgrade Banjaluka
1st Stage 1
 6th Overall Tour of Romania
 9th Chrono des Nations

References

External links

1992 births
Living people
German male cyclists
Cyclists from Dortmund
20th-century German people
21st-century German people